Antonia Alves ("Jovita") Feitosa (March 8, 1848 in Tauá, Brazil – October 9, 1867 in Rio de Janeiro, Brazil), was a Brazilian soldier who participated in the Paraguayan War. She is regarded as a military heroine, and as a symbol for the war against sexism.

Biography
Feitosa was born in Tauá. Her parents were Maximiano Bispo de Oliveira and Maria Alves Feitosa. She was described as being of medium height and having Indian features. After the death of her mother from cholera, Feitosa moved to Jaicós with her father to live with relatives. Here, she studied music. After a disagreement with an uncle, she set aside her music aspirations and moved to Teresina, where, at age 17, she enlisted in the military campaign of the Paraguayan War. In her first attempt at enlistment, she dressed as a man, cut her hair in a military style, wrapped her breasts, and wore a leather hat, attempting to look provincial. Though she managed to enlist, her feminine traits and holes in her ears gave her away and she was exposed by a woman in the marketplace.

Upon being taken to the police for questioning, she sobbed uncontrollably and expressed a desire to fight in the trenches. Though an offer was made to her to become an auxiliary nurse, she declined, stating she wanted to avenge the "humiliation passed by his countrymen at the hands of heartless Paraguayans." After her case was brought to the attention of Franklin Dória, Baron of Loreto, then president (the equivalent to the current post of governor) of the Province of Piauí, she was allowed to join the National Army as a second sergeant. She received uniforms and headed to Parnaíba with the other volunteers. She set out from Teresina on a steamship which eventually carried 1302 Piauíenses who comprised the 2nd Grouping of Volunteers, under the command of Major John Fernandes de Moraes. After arriving in Recife and São Luís, she was honored for her bravery, and dined with the presidents of the provinces.

The ship arrived in Rio de Janeiro on September 9, 1865. Here, Feitosa became a notable personality. Everyone wanted to meet the woman from Piauí who wanted to go to war. In November, the Minister of War, Visconde de Cairú, issued a letter denying permission for Feitosa to join the battlefront. Towards the end of the year, she became romantically involved with William Noot, an English engineer, and went to live with him at Russel Beach. He abandoned her without explanation. There are alternate versions surrounding her death. One theory is that she committed suicide with a dagger in the heart in 1867, at the age of 19. Another states that she died in the Battle of Acosta Ñu in 1869.

Legacy
Jovita Feitosa Square, named in her honor, is located in Fortaleza. In 2012, her biography was promoted in a TV special program by Cidade Verde as Feitosa and is considered to have paved the way for other women.

References

1848 births
1867 deaths
People from Tauá
19th-century Brazilian women
Brazilian military personnel of the Paraguayan War
Women in 19th-century warfare
Women in war in South America
Female wartime cross-dressers
19th-century Brazilian military personnel